Melicope wawraeana, the Monoa melicope, is a species of plant in the family Rutaceae. It is endemic to the Hawaiian Islands.

References

wawraeana
Endemic flora of Hawaii
Taxonomy articles created by Polbot